Gregg Arnold is an actor and sculptor.  Notable sculptures include Route 66 landmark Giganticus Headicus outside Kingman, Arizona.  He is also an actor in the independent 2016 film Protocol 734.

References

21st-century American sculptors
21st-century American male artists
Living people
Place of birth missing (living people)
Year of birth missing (living people)
21st-century American male actors